Everett Marshall (November 4, 1905 - February 10, 1973) was an American professional wrestler, who won championship titles in the Midwest Wrestling Association (MWA), National Wrestling Association (NWA) and Rocky Mountains.

Early life 
Everett Marshall was born on November 4, 1905 in La Junta, Colorado to Claude and Pearl Marshall.

Professional wrestling career 
Marshall frequently used armlocks and armpulls. His finisher was The Airplane Spin.

Marshall won the MWA World Heavyweight Title (Ohio version) in 1935. John Pesek previously held the title. The MWA awarded the title to Ray Steele in February 1937. After Steele was injured in a car accident, Marshall was again awarded the title.

In May 1937, Marshall defeated Chief Little Beaver for the NWA Texas World Heavyweight Title. 

Marshall met Ali Baba for the NWA World Heavyweight Title in June 1936 at Red Bird Stadium in Columbus, OH. Marshall defeated Ali Baba to claim the title, but it is not recognized. The title was awarded to John Pesek when Pesek was the only contender to post a $1000 bond. Pesek's recognition as champion was then withdrawn and the title was awarded back to Marshall at the 1938 NBA/NWA annual meeting. In February 1939, Lou Thesz defeated Marshall for the title in St. Louis, MO.

Marshall held the Rock Mountain Heavyweight Title at various times in 1945-1947.

Championships and accomplishments 
Midwest Wrestling Association
MWA Heavyweight Championship (1 time)
National Wrestling Association
NWA World Heavyweight Championship (1 times)1
National Wrestling Alliance
NWA Hall of Fame (2017)
Professional Wrestling Hall of Fame and Museum
(Class of 2011)
Wrestling Observer Newsletter
Hall of Fame (Class of 2009)

1This title is not the same championship nor does it have any connection to the world championship recognized and owned by the National Wrestling Alliance.

References

External links 
 

1905 births
1973 deaths
American male professional wrestlers
People from La Junta, Colorado
Professional wrestlers from Colorado
Professional Wrestling Hall of Fame and Museum